Montesson is a commune in the Yvelines department in the Île-de-France region in north-central France. It is located in the western suburbs of Paris.

Transport in Montesson is served by buses with T-tickets as well as by several Paris-suburban lines: Line 01, Line 04, Line 07, Line 19, Line 22. 
The bus tickets have a category called "Bus T" which is for occasional users and replaces the old tickets in the notebooks of the previous bus network.
The T ticket is also valid on the entire metro (Paris and suburbs) on the RER lines of the RATP and the SNCF. It is sold for a single price of 1.70 € for a journey or 12.50 € for a book of 10. It can be purchased all around the Ile de France metro stations, RER stations, bus terminals, and RATP authorized dealers.

Population

See also
Communes of the Yvelines department

References

External links

 http://flagspot.net/flags/fr-78-ms.html

Communes of Yvelines